János Komlós (9 February 1922, in Budapest – 18 July 1980, in Budapest) was an influential Hungarian-Jewish writer, journalist, stand-up comedian under the  Kádár political era in Hungary. A member of the ÁVH before 1956, he became an editor of the Népszabadság the Communist Party daily. In 1967, he founded the Mikroszkóp Színpad, which he directed until his death.

1922 births
1980 deaths

Hungarian Jews
Hungarian writers